Mario K. Frick (born 8 May 1965) is a former Head of Government (Regierungschef) of Liechtenstein and attorney-at-law.

Prime Minister of Liechtenstein
He was the Deputy Prime Minister from May 1993, and after the elections of October 1993 he became Europe's youngest Head of Government at 28 years old.

During his tenure as Prime Minister, Liechtenstein entered the European Economic Area after a successful referendum in 1995, and experienced economic growth. However, it also faced problems in its foreign relations, such as a dispute with the Czech Republic begun in 1992 over the confiscation of Prince Hans Adam's estates in 1945, and a 2001 dispute with Germany in the International Court of Justice over royal property confiscated in order to pay war debts.

Expanding Princely powers

After the end of his term as Prime Minister, Frick was notably prominent in the political controversy surrounding the constitutional referendum in 2003, whereby it was proposed that the ruling Prince be given wider powers; a number of other measures were also proposed. Frick led the opposition to the proposed changes which, however, were subsequently approved by the electorate.

Personal life
Frick's brother Jürgen was shot and killed in the underground garage of Frick & Co. Bank in the town of Balzers on April 7, 2014. The shooter Jürgen Hermann later shot and killed himself, his body found in Lake Constance on the German side of the lake. Hermann tried to sue Frick in 2010 but the suit was thrown out by the courts.

See also

 Politics of Liechtenstein

External links
Seeger, Frick & Partner—attorneys at law

References

 "Liechtenstein", Encyclopædia Britannica from Encyclopædia Britannica 2006 Ultimate Reference Suite DVD. Accessed October 11, 2008.

Heads of government of Liechtenstein
Deputy Prime Ministers of Liechtenstein
Patriotic Union (Liechtenstein) politicians
1965 births
Living people
Liechtenstein lawyers